Classic Cash: Hall of Fame Series is the 74th album by the American country singer Johnny Cash, released on Mercury Records in 1988 (see 1988 in music). It consists entirely of re-recordings of songs already associated with Cash from his Sun and Columbia days. The album has been both criticized and praised because of the use of several modern production techniques, including synthesizers, in an attempt to update and modernize Cash's earlier songs.

Track listing

Personnel
The Johnny Cash Band:
 Johnny Cash - vocals, acoustic guitar
 Earl P. Ball - piano
 Bob Wootton - electric guitar
 W.S. Holland - drums
 Jack Hale - harmonica, trumpet, French horn
 Bob Lewin - synthesizer, trumpet
 Jim Soldi - acoustic guitar, Dobro, electric guitar, backing vocals, synthesizer guitar, bottleneck guitar
 Jimmy Tittle - bass guitar, backing vocals
Additional musicians:
 Terry McMillan - harmonica
 Bryan "Bongo" O'Hanlon - percussion
 Matt Rollings - organ

Additional personnel
Produced by: Johnny Cash
Production assistant: Jimmy Tittle
Recorded and mixed by Donivan Cowart
Assistant to Donivan Cowart: Dave Sinko
Recorded at GCN Recording Studio, Nashville, Tennessee
Additional recording at Berry Hill Sound, Nashville, Tennessee
Mixed at the Castle Recording Studio, Franklin, Tennessee
Mastered by Glenn Meadows at Masterfonics, Nashville, Tennessee
Equipment handled by J.P. Powell and Jay Dauro
Photography: Alan Messer
Design and art direction: Dannah Hayes Macarthur, Hot Off the Griddle Productions
Liner notes by Tom T. Hall

References

External links

Johnny Cash albums
1988 albums
Mercury Nashville albums